John Ernest Ellis (10 November 1864 – 1 December 1927) was an English first-class cricketer, who played eleven matches for Yorkshire County Cricket Club between 1888 and 1892.

Born in Sheffield, Yorkshire, England, Ellis was a wicket-keeper, who took ten catches and completed eleven stumpings but was less successful with the bat, scoring 14 runs in fifteen innings for an average of 1.55.  His best score was 4 not out. He also played for Yorkshire Second XI in 1892.

Ellis died in Sheffield in December 1927.

References

External links
Cricinfo Profile

1864 births
1927 deaths
Yorkshire cricketers
Cricketers from Sheffield
English cricketers
English cricketers of 1864 to 1889
English cricketers of 1890 to 1918